Rishang Keishing (25 October 1920 – 22 August 2017) was an Indian politician from Manipur. Rishang served as Chief Minister of Manipur from 1980 to 1988 and from 1994 to 1998. He was former Member of Parliament, Rajya Sabha representing Manipur.

Early life and education
Rishang Keishing was born to Rungdi Keishing and Mungshingla Keishing, both from the Tangkhul Naga community in Bungpa Khunou, Ukhrul district of Manipur.

After a year at Kolkata's Scottish Church College, he transferred to the St. Paul's Cathedral Mission College, from which he graduated.

Positions held

 1952–57 Member, First Lok Sabha
 1957–61 and 1967-71 Member, Manipur Territorial Council
 1962–67 Member, Third Lok Sabha
 1972–1974 Member, Manipur Legislative Assembly
 1974–76 Cabinet Minister, Government of Manipur
 1976–80 Opposition Leader, Manipur Legislative Assembly
 1980–85 Chief Minister, Manipur
 1985-Feb.1988 Chief Minister, Manipur
 1994- March 1995 Chief Minister, Manipur
 1995- Dec. 1998 Chief Minister, Manipur
 April 2002 Elected to Rajya Sabha
 April 2002 - Feb. 2004 Member, Committee on Food, Civil Supplies and Public Distribution
 Jan. 2003-Feb. 2004 Member, Committee on Commerce
 Dec. 2003 onwards Member, Court of the North Eastern Hill University (NEHU)
 Aug. 2004 onwards Member, Committee on Home Affairs
 Oct. 2004 onwards Member, Consultative Committee for the Ministry of Shipping, Road Transport and Highways
 May 2006 - April 2007 Member, Committee on Public Undertakings
 April 2008 Re-elected to Rajya Sabha (2nd Term) and desired to retire on 21 February 2014 at the age of 94

Political career

Participated in the Freedom Struggle; attended meetings, etc. as a student during the period of 1945-47; Member, (i) Socialist Party of India, 1947–64, (ii) Indian delegation to Asian Socialist Conference held in Rangoon (Myanmar), January 1953, (iii) Indian National Congress since 1964, (iv) Indian delegation led by late Shri Yashwantrao Chavan to the 35th General Session of the UN held in U.S. in 1975, (v) Indian delegation to attend the 51st Commonwealth Parliamentary Conference held at Sheraton, Fiji, 2005 and (vi) Tenth Finance Commission; Founder Head Master of the first High School in the district at Ukhrul, 1949–52; Founding Member and Honorary Head Master, Phungyar High School, 1959–61; Founding Member, (i) High School, Kamjong, 1969 and (ii) High School at Kasom Khullen, 1970; was Chairman, (i) Eastern Border Development Authority and (ii) Barak Development Board, 1995–97; helped to set up, (i) Foundation for Management of Tribal Areas (MATA) in 1998, (ii) Fresh Ginger Oil Processing Pilot Project with technology developed by the NIIST, Trivandrum in 1998 and (iii) Fruit Processing Unit with technology developed by the CFTRI, Mysore (presently being set up).

In 1952, Keishing was elected to the first Lok Sabha representing the Socialist Party. Through his second term in the Lok Sabha, he informed Nehru that he wanted to join the Indian National Congress and remained with the party until his death.

He first entered Manipur State's Vidhan Sabha in 1972, winning Phungyar seat, and represented the seat for 30 years, winning the election 7 times. In 2002, he lost in the assembly polls. His son, Victor Keishing, reclaimed the seat a few years later. After his defeat in the state polls in 2002, Rishang Keishing moved to Delhi, representing the state in Rajya Sabha for two terms, 2002 to 2008, and 2008 and 2014. In 2007 he became the country's oldest parliamentarian. He retired from Rajya Sabha in 2014, at the age of 93.

Keishing, along with D. Athuido, a former Member of the Legislative Assembly, was expelled from the Manipur Congress for six years in May 1968. This disciplinary action was taken against them for signing a memorandum to the Prime Minister of India which suggested that the Naga-inhabited areas of Manipur should be merged with Nagaland. In August 1972, he spearheaded an agreement between then United Naga Integration Council and the ruling Indian National Congress which recognised the vision of a Greater Nagalim, a region that would integrate Nagaland and the Naga-populated districts of Manipur under one administration. 

Keishing served as the Chief Minister of Manipur from 1980 to 1988, and from 1994 to 1997.

In 2014, Keishing declared that he would not contest the Rajya Sabha elections after serving two consecutive terms. He said, "I am not interested to continue now."

Personal life
He married Khatingla Keishing in 1950, and the couple had two daughters and four sons. He died on Tuesday, 22 August 2017, aged 96 at Regional Institute of Medical Sciences Hospital, Imphal, Manipur.

References

External links
 Profile on Rajya Sabha website
 Rajya Sabha Member, Manipur

1920 births
2017 deaths
Manipur politicians
Indian National Congress politicians
Chief Ministers of Manipur
Naga people
Scottish Church College alumni
St. Paul's Cathedral Mission College alumni
University of Calcutta alumni
People from Imphal
Rajya Sabha members from Manipur
India MPs 1952–1957
India MPs 1962–1967
Lok Sabha members from Manipur
Chief ministers from Indian National Congress
Deputy Chief Ministers of Manipur
State cabinet ministers of Manipur
Manipur MLAs 1972–1974
Manipur MLAs 1974–1979
Manipur MLAs 1980–1984
Manipur MLAs 1985–1990
Manipur MLAs 1990–1995
Manipur MLAs 1995–2000